Andrea Coda (born 25 April 1985) is an Italian professional footballer who plays as a defender.

Club career

Empoli
Coda began playing youth football for Lucchese before joining Empoli, located an hour away from his hometown. He made his debut for Empoli when they were in Serie B and helped them gain promotion to Serie A for the 2005–06 season. In August 2005, he made his Serie A debut and became a regular starter.

Udinese
Udinese bought 50% of his contract in January 2006 for €1 million and he remained at Empoli until the summer. During the 2006–07 season, Coda had to contend with a place on the bench but he eventually earned a place in the starting eleven by the second half of the season. In June 2007, Udinese acquired the remainder of his contract for €1.315 million. By the 2008–09 season, he became first choice, often partnering Maurizio Domizzi, and made his European debut in September 2008 in the UEFA Cup. In March 2010, he was ruled out for the rest of the season after injuring his knee just barely five minutes into the match against Chievo Verona and had to be substituted.

In June 2010, Udinese agreed a double loan deal with Bari, subject to Coda and Jaime Romero's decision. Eventually Coda remained in Udine.

On 21 June 2012, Coda signed a new five-year contract after the club qualified for the UEFA Champions League playoffs round for a second successive season.

Sampdoria
On 22 January 2015, fellow Serie A club U.C. Sampdoria signed Coda and Luis Muriel in temporary deals, with an obligation to buy them outright for €12 million total fee. Coda signed a contract lasting until 30 June 2017.

Pescara
On 1 February 2016, Coda joined Pescara on loan for the rest of the season, with an option to purchase.

Viterbese Castrense
On 30 January 2019, he signed with Viterbese Castrense in Serie C.

Gubbio
On 9 November 2019 he joined Serie C club Gubbio until the end of the 2019–20 season.

International career
Coda played for Italy national team at every youth level, from the under-16 (was renamed from under-15 after 2000–01 season), to the Olympic team in Beijing. He also participated in 2004 UEFA European Under-19 Championship, 2005 FIFA World Youth Championship, 2006 UEFA European Under-21 Championship and 2007 UEFA European Under-21 Championship.

In order to prepare for the Olympics, he also played the match against Dutch Olympic team in February 2008, as well as in 2008 Toulon Tournament.

References

External links
FIGC.it National team stat. 
Udinese.it 
 

1985 births
People from Massa
Sportspeople from the Province of Massa-Carrara
Living people
Italian footballers
Empoli F.C. players
Udinese Calcio players
Parma Calcio 1913 players
U.S. Livorno 1915 players
U.C. Sampdoria players
Delfino Pescara 1936 players
U.S. Viterbese 1908 players
A.S. Gubbio 1910 players
Serie A players
Serie B players
Serie C players
Association football defenders
Italy youth international footballers
Italy under-21 international footballers
Olympic footballers of Italy
Footballers at the 2008 Summer Olympics
Footballers from Tuscany